Jean-Michel Lemieux is the former chief technology officer of Shopify.

Education and career 
Lemieux received a B.S. in Computer Science from the University of Ottawa.

Prior to becoming chief technology officer at Shopify, Lemieux was the Senior Vice President of Engineering after joining the company in 2015. Before working at Shopify, Lemieux was Vice President of Engineering at Atlassian and Chief Architect for Rational Team Concert. Lemieux holds two patents in the field of software configuration management and is the co-author of the book Eclipse Rich Client Platform.

In October 2019, Lemieux donated $100,100 to the fundraiser Team Trees, a collaborative initiative with the goal of raising $20 million by 2020 to plant 20 million trees. 

In 2020, Lemieux created a COVID response fund in his home town of Ottawa to help local non-profits during the pandemic. 

Lemieux is the owner and sole investor in Arlo, a Ottawa restaurant specializing in natural wine and refined food in a quirky and casual setting.

Eclipse Rich Client Platform 
Eclipse Rich Client Platform is a book about the rich client platform of the software Eclipse. The first edition of the book was published in 2005 and the second edition was published in 2010, both by Addison-Wesley Professional. The first edition was written by Jeff McAffer and Jean-Michel Lemieux, with the second edition being written by Jeff McAffer, Jean-Michel Lemieux, and Chris Aniszczyk. The book has received reviews from Today Software Magazine and Wayne Beaton, among others.

Patents 
 : "Software change management extension for uniformly handling artifacts with relaxed contraints"	
 : "Automated stream-based change flows within a software configuration management system"

References

Further reading 

 

Date of birth missing (living people)
Living people
Chief technology officers
University of Ottawa alumni
Atlassian people
Year of birth missing (living people)